Gerdu Chub (also Romanized as Gerdū Chūb; also known as Gerdoojoob, Gerdūchū’īyeh, and Kerdī Chow) is a village in Sarduiyeh Rural District, Sarduiyeh District, Jiroft County, Kerman Province, Iran. At the 2006 census, its population was 18, in 5 families.

References 

Populated places in Jiroft County